Joseph "Joja" Owusu Bempah (born 5 September 1995) is a Ghanaian footballer, who plays for Borac Čačak in Serbian First League.

Club career

Ghanaian Premier League
Born in Offinso, Ashanti Region, Ghana, Bempah played with several clubs in his early years, including King Faisal Babes, Real Tamale United and New Edubiase United. He joined Accra Hearts of Oak in 2012 and since the beginning of 2013 he became the first squad player. During the time he played with the club he was also awarded with a captain's armband. At the beginning of 2017, after the end of contract with his former club Hearts of Oak, he permanently moved to Bechem United as a free agent, but shortly after he terminated the deal.

Move to Europe: Vojvodina
Bempah moved to the Serbian SuperLiga side Vojvodina at the beginning of 2017, but due to administrative problems, he officially joined the club in May same year. He made his debut in 35 fixture of the 2016–17 season, replacing Siniša Babić in 84 minute of the match against Radnički Niš. On 7 June 2017, Bempah signed a three-year contract with the club. He scored his first goal for Vojvodina in opening match of the 2017–18 Serbian SuperLiga season for 1–0 win over Čukarički on 21 July 2017. Bempah also scored in the first match he started on the field, against Radnik Surdulica next week. On 9 August 2017, Bempah scored in 2–0 away win against Borac Čačak, helping Vojvodina to make 4th successive win and collect all 12 points at the beginning of the domestic competition in Serbia. At early December 2017, Bempah and Vojvodina mutually terminated the contract.

International career
Bempah captained Ghana national under-20 football team at the 2015 African U-20 Championship, where he won bronze medal, beating Mali for the third place on the tournament. Bempah was also a squad member at the 2015 FIFA U-20 World Cup, where he capped on match against Austria in a group stage.

Style of play
In early years of his career, Bempah has started playing football as a defender, mostly operating as a right side full-back being capable of playing left too. Beside the defensive skills, he has a great explosive power. Moving to the European football, Bempah has been mostly used as a defensive or central midfielder. Having a back-up role for a few months in his first matches with Vojvodina, he affirmed himself as a utility player. Bempah also capped as a second striker a couple of times before he became the regular member of Vojvodina's first squad as a right winger. As one of the most successful goal poachers, Bempah scored in 3 of 4 games at the beginning 2017–18 Serbian SuperLiga season.

Career statistics

Club

Honours
Ghana U20
African U-20 Championship bronze medal: 2015

References

External links
 
 
 
 
 
 

1995 births
Living people
People from Ashanti Region
Association football utility players
Ghanaian footballers
Ghana Premier League players
Accra Hearts of Oak S.C. players
Ghanaian expatriate footballers
Ghanaian expatriate sportspeople in Serbia
Expatriate footballers in Serbia
FK Vojvodina players
FK Sloboda Užice players
FK Proleter Novi Sad players
FK Radnički Pirot players
Serbian SuperLiga players
Serbian First League players
Murciélagos FC footballers
Liga MX players
Expatriate footballers in Mexico
Association football fullbacks
Association football midfielders
Real Tamale United players
New Edubiase United F.C. players